The Flatbush Stakes was an American Thoroughbred horse race run annually at Sheepshead Bay Race Track in Sheepshead Bay, Brooklyn, New York. Held in September, it was an important event for two-year-olds of either sex. The race was run on dirt over a distance of seven furlongs and was generally the longest distance to that point for the participants who were in their first year of racing.

The inaugural running in 1884 was won by the filly Wanda who was selected through a present-day review process by Thoroughbred Heritage as the 1884 American Champion Two-Year-Old Female
 The final running in 1909 was won by the colt Waldo who would earn annual Co-Champion honors as one of the 1887–1935 Champions selected retrospectively by a panel of experts as published by the widely respected The Blood-Horse magazine.

Champions who won the Flatbush Stakes

Lady Violet 
Requital
Ornament
Nasturtium
Irish Lad
Highball
Colin (HoF)
Sir Martin
Waldo

Demise of the Flatbush Stakes 
On June 11, 1908, the Republican controlled New York Legislature under Governor Charles Evans Hughes passed the Hart–Agnew anti-betting legislation with penalties allowing for fines and up to a year in prison. The owners of Sheepshead Bay Race Track, and other racing facilities in New York State, struggled to stay in business without betting. Racetrack operators had no choice but to drastically reduce the purse money being paid out which by 1909 saw the Flatbush Stakes offering a purse that was nearly a tenth of what it had been in earlier years. Further restrictive legislation was passed by the New York Legislature in 1910 which deepened the financial crisis for track operators and led to a complete shut down of racing across the state during 1911 and 1912. When a Court ruling saw racing return in 1913 it was too late for the Sheepshead Bay horse racing facility and it never reopened.

Records
Speed record:
1:24.80 – Colin (1907)

Most wins by a jockey:
 2 – Tod Sloan (1897, 1900)
 2 – Anthony Hamilton (1889, 1890)
 2 – Samuel Doggett (1893, 1894)
 2 – Nash Turner (1901, 1902)

Most wins by a trainer:
 3 – Matthew Byrnes (1884, 1888, 1893)
 3 – A. Jack Joyner (1892, 1898, 1904)
 3 – Bud May (1903, 1905, 1906)

Most wins by an owner:
 3 – William C. Whitney (1900, 1901, 1902)

Winners

 † In 1898, Martimas won but was disqualified.

References

Flat horse races for two-year-olds
Discontinued horse races in New York City
Sheepshead Bay Race Track
Recurring sporting events established in 1884
Recurring events disestablished in 1909
1884 establishments in New York (state)
1909 disestablishments in New York (state)